The Texas-Mexican Conjunto: History of a Working-Class Music is a 1985 non-fiction book by Manuel H. Peña, published by University of Texas Press. It documents Tejano conjunto music established in the 20th century. The author states that the music reflects how communities on the Mexico-United States border evolved and how the communities opposed assimilating to the dominant American culture.

The author interviewed musicians and posted quotes from said interviews in his work. He used Marxist theory in creating the work.

Reception
James S. Griffith of University of Arizona described the book as "useful and fascinating".

References
 
  - Profile

Notes

Further reading

External links
 
 The Texas-Mexican Conjunto at JSTOR

University of Texas Press books
Music books
1985 books